Red Book is the seventh album from Scottish rock band Texas. It was released on 7 November 2005 and entered the UK Albums Chart at #16. It is named after the little red book that singer Sharleen Spiteri used to write the album songs. The album yielded two UK Top Ten singles, "Getaway" and "Sleep" and the UK Top 20 single, "Can't Resist". Four of the album's tracks were co-written with Brian Higgins of Xenomania — "Can't Resist", "Cry", "Get Down Tonight" and "Bad Weather".

Red Book was the group's last studio album before their hiatus which they embarked on after the Red Book tour. Lead singer Spiteri would go on to release her debut solo album, Melody in 2008.

Track listing

Personnel
  Backing Vocals - Michael Bannister (tracks: 4, 8, 10), Miranda Cooper (tracks: 3, 5, 7), Sharleen Spiteri (tracks: 2 to 5, 7, 8, 10)
 Bass - Johnny McElhone (tracks: 2, 8 to 10)
 Guitar - Ally McErlaine (tracks: 2, 4, 7, 8, 10 to 12), Johnny McElhone (tracks: 2, 7 to 10, 12), Sharleen Spiteri (tracks: 2, 8 to 10, 12), Shawn Lee (tracks: 3, 5, 7), Tony McGovern (tracks: 7, 9, 12)
 Keyboards - Johnny McElhone (tracks: 1 to 4, 7, 8 to 12), Michael Bannister (tracks: 1 to 4, 8, 10, 12), Sharleen Spiteri (tracks: 1 to 4, 8, 9, 11), Tim Powell (tracks: 3, 5, 7)
 Mixed By - Mark "Spike" Stent (tracks: 3 to 5, 7, 9), Mike Hedges (tracks: 6, 8, 10, 12)
 Piano - Michael Bannister (tracks: 6, 8, 10, 12)
 Producer [Co Producer] - Johnny Mac (tracks: 4)
 Programmed By - Johnny McElhone (tracks: 2 to 4, 8, 11), Michael Bannister (tracks: 2 to 4), Sharleen Spiteri (tracks: 2 to 4, 11)
 Vocals - Sharleen Spiteri

Chart positions

Certifications

References

2005 albums
Albums produced by Xenomania
albums produced by Rick Nowels
Texas (band) albums
Mercury Records albums